The women's 10 metre platform was one of five diving events on the diving at the 1920 Summer Olympics programme. The competition was held on Wednesday, 24 August 1920 (first round) and on Montag, 29 August 1920 (final). Fifteen divers from six nations competed.

Results

First round

Wednesday, 24 August 1920: The three divers who scored the smallest number of points in each group of the first round advanced to the final.

Group 1

Group 2

Final
Monday, 29 August 1920:

References

Sources
 
 

Women
1920
1920 in women's diving
Div